Syncopacma genistae is a moth of the family Gelechiidae. It is found on the Canary Islands.

The wingspan is about 8 mm. The forewings are pale brownish olivaceous at the base, blending to blackish about the middle. The terminal area is sprinkled with brownish, blackish and steel grey scales. The hindwings are leaden grey.

The larvae feed within the shoots of Genista canariensis.

References

Moths described in 1908
Syncopacma